Wilfred Proctor (23 November 1893 – 29 October 1980) was an English professional footballer who played as a winger. He started his career with his hometown club Blackpool but failed to make a first-team appearance and left the club in 1921 to join newly promoted Nelson. He played 14 league games and scored one goal in the Football League Third Division North before leaving Nelson in the summer of 1922.

References

English footballers
Association football wingers
Blackpool F.C. players
Nelson F.C. players
Fleetwood Town F.C. players
Lancaster City F.C. players
English Football League players
People from Fenton, Staffordshire
Footballers from Stoke-on-Trent
1893 births
1980 deaths